Bohdan Kovalenko (born 24 April 1997) is a professional Ukrainian football striker who plays for FC Mynai.

Career
Bohdan is a product of the youth team systems of FC Arsenal Kyiv and FC Shakhtar Donetsk.

After playing in the Ukrainian Premier League Reserves, the Ukrainian Second League and the Ukrainian Amateurs, he was signed by Pafos FC, a team from Cyprus.

Honours
Riga
 Latvian Higher League: 2018
 Latvian Cup: 2018

Chaika Kyiv-Sviatoshyn Raion
 Ukrainian Football Amateur League: 2017–18

References

External links

1997 births
Living people
Footballers from Kyiv
Ukrainian footballers
FC Shakhtar-3 Donetsk players
SC Chaika Petropavlivska Borshchahivka players
Association football forwards
Pafos FC players
Ukrainian expatriate footballers
Expatriate footballers in Cyprus
Ukrainian expatriate sportspeople in Cyprus
Expatriate footballers in Latvia
Riga FC players
Ukrainian expatriate sportspeople in Latvia
BFC Daugavpils players
FC Chornomorets Odesa players
FC Mynai players
Expatriate footballers in Russia
Ukrainian expatriate sportspeople in Russia
Ukrainian Premier League players
Ukrainian First League players
Ukrainian Second League players
Ukraine youth international footballers
FC Veles Moscow players